Devon Ericson is an American actress and cover singer.

Early years
Ericson was born in Salt Lake City and was named for Devon, England. Her mother, Audrey Planty, won British ice-skating championships and toured with the Ice Follies in the United States. Her father was an American of Swedish descent. They separated when Ericson was 8 years old, and she moved with her mother to San Diego, where her mother operated an ice rink.

As a youngster, Ericson participated in contests in speech and debate. She attended the school of performing arts at United States International University in San Diego and later studied at its satellite campus at Ashdown Park, England.

Career
Ericson first performed professionally in England, acting in As You Like It and dancing in a revue. She came to the United States to act in the play Pajama Tops in Philadelphia. After that, debuted on American television as John-Boy Walton's girlfriend on The Waltons.. Also on TV, she portrayed Betsy O'Neal in The Chisholms, Rachel Peters in Family, and Rebecca Bryan in Young Dan'l Boone. She appeared on the TV series Barnaby Jones, Police Story, Starsky & Hutch, The Streets of San Francisco, Jenny Wood on Three's Company, Jane Foley on It's a Living, and Magnum, P.I. and on the miniseries Eleanor and Franklin, Studs Lonigan, Testimony of Two Men, Buck Rogers in the 25th Century, Knight Rider, Airwolf, The A-Team and The Awakening Land.

References

External links 

 

Living people
20th-century American actresses
American stage actresses
American television actresses
Actresses from Salt Lake City
United States International University alumni
21st-century American women
Year of birth missing (living people)